Mette V. Jensen (born 28 May 1987) is a Danish football midfielder. She currently plays for Fortuna Hjørring and the Danish national team.

References
Danish Football Union (DBU) statistics

External links 
 
 Denmark player profile

1987 births
Living people
Danish women's footballers
Denmark women's international footballers
Fortuna Hjørring players
Women's association football midfielders